When Nietzsche Wept is a 1992 novel by Irvin D. Yalom, Emeritus Professor of Psychiatry at Stanford University, an existentialist, and psychotherapist. The book takes place mostly in Vienna, Austria, in the year 1882, and relates a fictional meeting between the doctor Josef Breuer and the German philosopher Friedrich Nietzsche. The novel is a review of the history of philosophy and psychoanalysis and some of the main personalities of the last decades of the 19th century, and revolves around the topic of "limerence".

Plot

Lou Salomé, who was involved with Friedrich Nietzsche, has written a letter stating that the future of the philosophy of Germany is at stake and that Nietzsche needs help desperately. The plot develops into a therapy in which Doctor Josef Breuer needs to have his soul treated to help him get over a patient whom he treated for hysteria and with whom he has fallen in love, while Nietzsche needs help with his migraines. Influenced by the revolutionary ideas of his young disciple Sigmund Freud, Josef Breuer starts the dangerous strategy that will become the origin of psychoanalysis. Thanks to their unusual relation, both of them will see how their perspective of life changes completely. The story also explains how Friedrich Nietzsche received the inspiration to write his famous book, Thus Spoke Zarathustra.

References to famous personalities
Yalom's book is fictional but contains many references to history and historical personalities: Josef and Mathilde Breuer, Friedrich Nietzsche, Lou Salome, Sigmund Freud, Bertha Pappenheim, Paul Rée as well as mentioning Franz Overbeck, and the composer Richard Wagner.

Adaptations
In 2007 Yalom's novel received a film adaptation by the director Pinchas Perry, starring Armand Assante, Ben Cross and Katheryn Winnick. This independent American drama was filmed in Bulgaria.

There is also a theatre play based on the novel, adapted by Luciano Cazaux. The roles of Friedrich Nietzsche and Josef Breuer are performed by the actors Luciano Suardi and Claudio Da Passano. The play reflects the intellectual and philosophical atmosphere of the novel, almost dreamlike sometimes. An example of those details is that the female characters of the play wear colorful dresses, while the male characters wear black or grey suits; that is because the play tries to represent its reality from the point of view of the intellectual men of that period. The theatre play has received positive reviews in general, commending the work of the actors and actresses.

See also
When Nietzsche Wept, the film adaptation of the book
The Schopenhauer Cure

1992 American novels
American novels adapted into films
American novels adapted into plays
Novels set in Vienna
Cultural depictions of Sigmund Freud
Cultural depictions of Josef Breuer
Cultural depictions of Friedrich Nietzsche
Works about Friedrich Nietzsche
Novels about philosophers
Psychotherapy in fiction
Fiction set in 1882
Novels set in the 1880s
Basic Books books